Xianglujiao is a station on Line 3 of the Dalian Metro in Liaoning Province, China. It is located in the Xigang District of Dalian City.

Around the station
 Dalian Mosque

References

Railway stations in Liaoning